Uksedalshøe or Oksedalshøi is a mountain in Vang Municipality in Innlandet county, Norway. The mountain is surrounded by several other notable mountains including Høgbrothøgdi to the northwest, Slettmarkkampen and Slettmarkpiggen to the northeast, and Galdeberget to the east. The lake Bygdin lies to the south of the mountain.

See also
List of mountains of Norway by height

References

Vang, Innlandet
Mountains of Innlandet